Leon Russom (born December 6, 1941) is an American actor who appeared in numerous television series, particularly soap operas. He portrayed Admiral Toddman (in the Star Trek: Deep Space Nine episode "The Die is Cast") and the Starfleet Commander-in-Chief in Star Trek VI: The Undiscovered Country. In his later years, he has appeared in shows such as Bones, Jericho, Prison Break, and Cold Case. Russom worked with the Coen brothers twice, playing smaller parts in The Big Lebowski (1998) and True Grit (2010).

Early career
Russom's first acting work was on the CBS soap opera Guiding Light in the late 1960s. He subsequently appeared in another CBS soap opera Love is a Many Splendored Thing as Joe Taylor from 1972 to 1973. Russom was the second actor to play the role of Willis Frame on the NBC soap Another World, a role that he kept for several years. His early film career included The Trial of the Catonsville Nine as David Durst and Stephen King's Silver Bullet. He also appeared on the TV show Mission: Impossible as Sam Evans.

Emmy nomination
At the 1991 Emmys, Russom received a nomination for his work in the category Outstanding Supporting Actor in a Miniseries or Special for his work on the 1991 television movie Long Road Home as Titus Wardlow.

Later work
Leon Russom's later work included many appearances in dramas, mainly legal or crime. He appeared in many TV shows in the 1990s and the early 2000s, including L.A. Law, Bones, Cold Case, Law & Order, JAG, NYPD Blue, John Doe, The X-Files, Dark Skies, Seinfeld (as an Astros representative in "The Hot Tub") and other shows. He played the police chief of Malibu in the Coen brothers' The Big Lebowski (1998). Recently he appeared in Prison Break as General Jonathan Krantz, head of The Company. His role in the series was initially minor, restricted to sporadic non-speaking appearances. But from the third season on, his role took on increasing importance, culminating in his becoming the main antagonist, right up to The Final Break. He teamed with the Coen brothers once more to play a sheriff in True Grit.

Russom is also a stage actor, and in 2012, he was nominated for an LA Weekly Theater Award for his portrayal of Hamm in Samuel Beckett's Endgame at Los Angeles' Sacred Fools Theater Company, where he served as a co-artistic director for the company's sixteenth season, alongside fellow company members French Stewart and Alyssa Preston. In 2013, he appeared as the Earl of Gloucester in King Lear with The Porters of Hellsgate, alongside Larry Cedar as King Lear. In 2018, he appeared in a small but significant role in John Krasinski's acclaimed horror film, A Quiet Place.

Selected filmography 
The Trial of the Catonsville Nine (1972) as David Darst
Silver Bullet (1985) as Bob Coslaw
Hotshot (1987) as Coach
No Way Out (1987) as Kevin O'Brien
The Rescue (1988) as Captain Miller
Fresh Horses (1988) as Kyle Larkin
He Said, She Said (1991) as Harry
Star Trek VI: The Undiscovered Country (1991) as Chief-in-Command
The Adventures of Huck Finn (1993) as Shanty Lady's Husband
Double Dragon (1994) as Chief Delario
Goldilocks and the Three Bears (1995) as Joshua Crane
The Phantom (1996) as Mayor Krebs
Reasons of the Heart (1996) as Drew Hadley
The Big Lebowski (1998) as Malibu Police Chief
Diagnosis: Murder (2000) as Claude Campbell
Men of Honor (2000) as Decker
A Visit from the Sergeant Major with Unintended Consequences (2000) as Mr. White
Ascension (2000) as Old Man
Behind Enemy Lines (2001) as Ed Burnett
Buttleman (2003) as Reverend Buttleman
 Prison Break (2005) as General Jonathan Krantz
True Grit (2010) as Sheriff
Fuzz Track City (2012) as Victor Swick
Lost on Purpose (2013) as Gene Lee
The Binding (2016) as Uriel
The Midnighters (2016) as Victor
Bethany (2017) as Doctor Merman
The Fuzz (2017) as Victor Swick
A Quiet Place (2018) as Man in the woods

References

External links 
 

1941 births
American male film actors
American male television actors
Living people
Male actors from Little Rock, Arkansas